Lanser Broadcasting is a privately owned company based in Zeeland, Michigan, USA, which owns and operates the WJQK and WPNW radio stations. Les Lanser and his son Brad are the sole owners.

WPNW

Lanser Broadcasting has owned WPNW (1260 MHz) since January 1982 when it purchased WJBL-AM and changed the call letters to WWJQ. The call letters changed to WPNW in January 2003. It transmits from just south of West Michigan Regional Airport in Holland, Michigan. Daytime power is 10,000 watts. Nighttime power is 1,000 watts.

WJQK

The country music station WZND (99.3 MHz) was purchased in January 1987 and renamed WJQK. The transmitter was originally located at I-196 and State Street (96th Avenue) just south of Zeeland. In an effort to send a better signal into Grand Rapids, it was moved three miles east in 1992. It broadcasts with an effective radiated power of 4,700 watts.

There is no known meaning of what the JQK or WJQ in the call letters stood for. PNW stood for Praise And Worship, a previous format used until September 2005 when it was switched to news and talk.

External links
 WJQK web site
 WPNW web site

Radio broadcasting companies of the United States
Companies based in Michigan
Zeeland, Michigan
Holland, Michigan